was a town located in Hikami District, Hyōgo Prefecture, Japan.

As of 2003, the town had an estimated population of 10,068 and a density of 130.50 persons per km². The total area was 77.15 km².

On November 1, 2004, Ichijima, along with the towns of Hikami, Aogaki, Kaibara, Kasuga and Sannan (all from Hikami District), was merged to create the city of Tamba and no longer exists as an independent municipality.

External links
 Official website of the Ichijima Chamber of Commerce in Japanese

Dissolved municipalities of Hyōgo Prefecture
Tamba, Hyōgo